This is a list of European regions (Nomenclature of Territorial Units for Statistics regions) sorted by their average life expectancy at birth. Eurostat calculates the life expectancy based on the information provided by national statistics institutes affiliated to Eurostat. The list presents statistics for 2016 from Eurostat, as of 3 June 2018.

2016 list

See also
List of European countries by life expectancy
List of German states by life expectancy

References 

Demographic lists
Europe
Life expectancy
Europe health-related lists